Nicolás Abot (born September 28, 1985 in Mar del Plata, Argentina) is an Argentine footballer.

Career 
Nicolás Abot joined the Latvian Higher League club FC Jūrmala in July 2014. Under the management of former Manchester United player Andrei Kanchelskis he played 10 league matches and scored 3 goals. He joined Persebaya on December 9, 2014.

In 2017, Abot hat spells with Maltese club Victoria Wanderers and Italian Promozione club Atletico Tricase.

References

External links 
 
 Nicolás Abot at BDFA

1985 births
Living people
Sportspeople from Mar del Plata
Argentine expatriate footballers
Argentine footballers
Argentine expatriate sportspeople in Spain
Argentine expatriate sportspeople in Ecuador
Argentine expatriate sportspeople in Italy
Argentine expatriate sportspeople in Bolivia
Argentine expatriate sportspeople in Uruguay
Argentine expatriate sportspeople in Costa Rica
Argentine expatriate sportspeople in Latvia
Argentine expatriate sportspeople in Venezuela
Argentine expatriate sportspeople in Indonesia
Argentine expatriate sportspeople in Thailand
Argentine expatriate sportspeople in Malta
Argentine expatriate sportspeople in Greece
Argentine expatriate sportspeople in Australia
Expatriate footballers in Spain
Expatriate footballers in Ecuador
Expatriate footballers in Italy
Expatriate footballers in Bolivia
Expatriate footballers in Uruguay
Expatriate footballers in Costa Rica
Expatriate footballers in Latvia
Expatriate footballers in Venezuela
Expatriate footballers in Indonesia
Expatriate footballers in Thailand
Expatriate footballers in Malta
Expatriate footballers in Greece
Expatriate soccer players in Australia
FC Jūrmala players
Persebaya Surabaya players
Club Olimpo footballers
Municipal Pérez Zeledón footballers
Deportivo Azogues footballers
Zamora FC players
Rampla Juniors players
Deportivo Laferrere footballers
Club Blooming players
Nicolas Abot
Tasman United players
Liga 1 (Indonesia) players
Promozione players
Association football forwards